Murder Mountain, originally marketed as Murder Mountain: Welcome to Humboldt County, is an American true crime documentary television series that premiered on Fusion TV on September 23, 2018. Netflix picked up the series and it premiered on the platform on December 28, 2018. The show covers an area of Northern California's Humboldt County, including the local marijuana industry, and multiple disappearances and murders that have occurred in the surrounding mountain range. Much of the show follows the case of 29-year-old Garret Rodriguez, a cannabis grower who was found murdered in the region in 2013.

Episodes

Reception 
Murder Mountain has received mostly positive reviews. Writing for The Daily Beast, Melissa Leon said that though it is "not the next Making a Murderer ... Murder Mountain is an eye-opening watch". Lea Palmieri of Decider wrote, "if a weed farm and several unexplained missing persons doesn't add up to a compelling binge-watch, then nothing does". For Film Inquiry, Tom Bedford describes the series as “a fascinating insight into unique communities, unexplored lands, and disenfranchised voices.” 

Officials in the Humboldt County area criticized the series and expressed worry over the potential long-term effects on local tourism and economic development. The Humboldt County Sheriff's Office questioned the accuracy of the series, calling it "one side of a highly sensationalized story".

See also 

 Alderpoint, California
 Michael Bear Carson and Suzan Carson
 Emerald Triangle
 Sasquatch (TV series)
 Sequoia County, California

References

External links 
  on Fusion TV
  on Netflix
 

English-language Netflix original programming
Netflix original documentary television series
True crime television series
2018 American television series debuts
Cannabis in California
Works about cannabis trafficking
Television series about illegal drug trade
Crimes in Humboldt County, California